Super Star El Arab is the first album of songs performed by Diana Karazon, the winner of the Arabic TV series Super Star.

See also
Jordanian music

2003 albums
Diana Karazon albums
Arabic-language albums